Thomas Guthrie is an English director, actor and baritone singer.

Guthrie was born in England. He began singing as a boy under George Guest at St John's College, Cambridge. He then  read Classics at Trinity College, Cambridge before winning a scholarship to study at the Royal Northern College of Music, where he won prizes including the Brigitte Fassbaender Award for Lieder, the Schubert Prize, and an English-Speaking Union (ESU) scholarship to study with Thomas Allen in Chicago.

In 2002 he co-directed the Bampton Classical Opera production of Waiting for Figaro.

In 2010, 2011 and 2013 he and Gwyneth Herbert sang in The Playlist, a series of BBC Radio 4 broadcasts recreating the previously unknown musical lives of famous figures from the past, discovering and recording their favourite songs – including songs they themselves had composed.

He directed a critically acclaimed production of Rossini's The Barber of Seville at London's Royal Opera House in 2014.

In early April 2020, in the era of coronavirus, he organised a multi-musician internet recital, with participants singing or playing  the ballad "Where Have All The Flowers Gone?" from their homes to raise funds for Help Musicians UK. The result was uploaded to the internet and widely viewed.

References

External links
Official website

Living people
Alumni of the Royal Northern College of Music
Alumni of Trinity College, Cambridge
British opera directors
English male actors
English operatic baritones
Place of birth missing (living people)
Year of birth missing (living people)